A huntress is a woman who engages in the act of hunting. A stock character in fantasy fiction.

Huntress may also refer to:

People
 Harriet Lane Huntress (1860-1922), Deputy Superintendent Public Instruction in New Hampshire, U.S.
 Wesley Huntress, U.S. space scientist

Fictional characters
Huntress, also known as Mockingbird, a Marvel Comics character that first appeared in 1971
Huntress (DC Comics), the name of several DC Comics characters, including:
Huntress, an identity of Paula Brooks, a Golden Age supervillain character
Huntress (Helena Wayne), a superhero character that first appeared in 1977
Huntress (Helena Bertinelli), a superhero character that first appeared in 1989

Places
Huntress Glacier, Livingston Island, South Shetland Islands
7225 Huntress, the asteroid 'Huntress'

Film
 The Huntress (film), a 1923 American drama film
The Huntresses (2014 film), a 2014 South Korean period action film

Literature
The Huntress, a 19th-century American periodical published by Anne Royall
The Huntress, a 2019 novel by Kate Quinn
Huntress, a young adult fantasy novel by Malinda Lo

Vehicles
 , a U.S. Navy ship name
 , a U.S. schooner

Other uses
Huntress (band), a California metal band
The Huntress (TV series), a 2000s television series about a female bounty hunter

See also

 
 
 
 Hunt (disambiguation)
 Hunter (disambiguation)
 Huntsman (disambiguation)
 Hunting (disambiguation)